The Kadunce River is an  stream in northeastern Minnesota, the United States, flowing into Lake Superior.

See also
List of rivers of Minnesota

References

Minnesota Watersheds
USGS Hydrologic Unit Map - State of Minnesota (1974)

Rivers of Cook County, Minnesota
Tributaries of Lake Superior